Dhashukubaa is one of the nine traditional divisions in Fuvahmulah, Maldives. It has been merged with Miskiymagu, reducing the number of current subdivisions of Fuvahmulah to eight.

Subdivisions of the Maldives